Spike is a 1983 platform game for the Vectrex video game system. The character of Spike is considered a mascot of the Vectrex, being among the first video game mascots, and Spike is one of the earliest examples of voice synthesis in video games. Spike is included in the iOS Vectrex Regeneration app.

Gameplay
The player must navigate a tiny creature named Spike through chasms and ladders while avoiding enemies and endless pits. The player must collect Molly's bows to unlock doors and reach the final level to save Molly from the boss named Spud and bring her home.

References

1983 video games
Platform games
Vectrex games
Video games developed in the United States
Single-player video games